The UCI Track Cycling World Championships – Men's keirin is the world championship Keirin event held annually at the UCI Track Cycling World Championships. It was first held at the 1980 championships in Besançon, France. , Chris Hoy from Great Britain has the most titles with four, as well as being the only man to win the World and Olympic titles in the same year, which he achieved twice, in 2008 and 2012.

Medalists

Medal table

See also
Koichi Nakano
1980 UCI Track Cycling World Championships
UCI Track Cycling World Championships – Women's keirin

External links
Track Cycling World Championships 2016–1893 bikecult.com
World Championship, Track, Keirin, Elite cyclingarchives.com

 
Men's keirin
Lists of UCI Track Cycling World Championships medalists